Capperia raptor is a moth of the family Pterophoridae. It is found in North America, including Colorado, Indiana and Canada.

The wingspan is about 19 mm. The abdomen is brown mixed with dark fuscous. The forewings are ferruginous-fuscous, irrorated (speckled) with dark fuscous. There is a small dark fuscous spot on the base of the cleft.

References

External links
mothphotographersgroup

Moths described in 1908
Oxyptilini